Hussain Tousi was an Iranian boxer. He competed in the men's middleweight event at the 1948 Summer Olympics.

References

External links
  

Year of birth missing
Possibly living people
Iranian male boxers
Olympic boxers of Iran
Boxers at the 1948 Summer Olympics
Place of birth missing
Middleweight boxers
20th-century Iranian people